Masca is a village on the island of Tenerife, Spain.

Masca may also refer to:

Mașca, a village in Iara, Romania
Mâsca, a village in Șiria, Romania
Masca (moth), a genus of moths in the family Erebidae
, shaman women believed to possess healing powers in Piedmontese folklore